Margarella gunnerusensis is a species of sea snail, a marine gastropod mollusk in the family Calliostomatidae.

References

External links
 To World Register of Marine Species

gunnerusensis
Gastropods described in 1996